Bohus Battalion (Swedish: Bohus bataljon) is a 1949 Swedish comedy film directed by Sölve Cederstrand and Arthur Spjuth and starring Per Grundén, Doris Svedlund and Gus Dahlström. It was shot at the Centrumateljéerna Studios in Stockholm. The film's sets were designed by the art director P.A. Lundgren. It was part of a tradition of comedies in Swedish cinema following those called up for military service.

Cast
 Per Grundén as 	112 Pelle Holm
 Doris Svedlund as 	Elsie Tonérus
 Gus Dahlström as 	116 Kålle Götlund 
 Holger Höglund as 	114 Kirre Johansson 
 Fritiof Billquist as 	Capt. Lundberg
 Anne-Margrethe Björlin as 	Marja Holm
 Gunnar Olsson as Sebastian Tonérus
 Sten Lindgren as Capt. Striktberg
 Gösta Prüzelius as	Kurt Kronborg
 Carin Swensson as 	Lisa
 Bengt Berger as 	Private 
 Astrid Bodin as 	Woman in window 
 Helga Brofeldt as 	Woman in window 
 Siegfried Fischer as 	Sträng 
 Anna-Lisa Fröberg as 	Guest at Tonérus' party 
 Ivar Hallbäck as 	Colonel 
 Leif Hedenberg as 	Furir 
 Sten Hedlund as Officer 
 Nils Hultgren as 	Fanjukaren 
 Stig Johanson as 	Kalle Westerberg 
 Ivar Kåge as	Colonel
 Hildur Lindberg as	Blå Stjärna 
 Adèle Lundvall as 	Blå Stjärna
 Aurore Palmgren as 	Alma 
 Mauritz Strömbom as 	Officer
 Rune Stylander as 	Speaker 
 Olle Ståhl as 	Guest at Tonérus' party
 Tord Stål as 	Officer 
 Gunnar Swahn as Stallfurir 
 Bruno Sörwing as 	Private

References

Bibliography 
 Krawc, Alfred. International Directory of Cinematographers, Set- and Costume Designers in Film: Denmark, Finland, Norway, Sweden (from the beginnings to 1984). Saur, 1986.

External links 
 

1949 films
1949 comedy films
Swedish comedy films
1940s Swedish-language films
Films directed by Sölve Cederstrand
Films directed by Arthur Spjuth
1940s Swedish films